Bình Chánh may refer to several places in Vietnam, including:

Bình Chánh District, an urban district of Ho Chi Minh City
Bình Chánh, Bình Chánh District, a ward of Bình Chánh District
Bình Chánh, An Giang, a commune of Châu Phú District
Bình Chánh, Quảng Ngãi, a commune of Bình Sơn District
Bình Chánh, Quảng Nam, a commune of Thăng Bình District